Khowar or Chitrali, is an Indo-Aryan language primarily spoken in Chitral and surrounding areas in Pakistan.

Khowar is the lingua franca of Chitral, and it is also spoken in the Gupis-Yasin and Ghizer districts of Gilgit-Baltistan, as well in the Upper Swat district. 

Speakers of Khowar have also migrated heavily to Pakistan's major urban centres, with Peshawar, Islamabad, Lahore and Karachi having significant populations. It is also spoken as a second language by the Kalash people.

Names
The native name of the language is Khō-wār, meaning "language" (wār) of the Kho people. During the British Raj it was known to the English as Chitrālī (a derived adjective from the name of the Chitral region) or Qāshqārī. Among the Pashtuns and Badakhshanis it is known as Kashkār. Another name, used by Leitner in 1880, is Arnyiá or Arniya, derived from the Shina language name for the part of the Yasin (a valley in Gilgit-Baltistan) where Khowar is spoken. Lastly, the Wakhis and Sanglechis refer to the language and its speakers as Kivi.

History
Georg Morgenstierne noted, "Khowar, in many respects [is] the most archaic of all modern Indian languages, retaining a great part of Sanskrit case inflexion, and retaining many words in a nearly Sanskritic form".

Phonology

Khowar has a variety of dialects, which may vary phonemically. The following tables lay out the basic phonology of Khowar.

Vowels

Sources are inconsistent on whether length is phonemic, with one author stating "vowel-length is observed mainly as a substitute one. The vowel-length of phonological value is noted far more rarely." Unlike the neighboring and related Kalasha language, Khowar does not have retroflex vowels.

Consonants

Tone

Khowar, like many Dardic languages, has either phonemic tone or stress distinctions.

Writing system

Since the early twentieth century Khowar has been written in the Khowar alphabet, which is based on the Urdu alphabet and uses the Nasta'liq script. Prior to that, the language was carried on through oral tradition. Today Urdu and English are the official languages and the only major literary usage of Khowar is in both poetry and prose composition. Khowar has also been occasionally written in a version of the Roman script called Roman Khowar since the 1960s.

Dialects

 Standard Khowar
 Chitrali Khowar
 Kalam Khowar (Swat Kohistan)
 Lotkuhiwar (Lotkuh Valley/ Gramchashma Valley)
 Gherzikwar (Ghizer Valley)
 Gilgiti Khowar (Gilgit-Baltistan), spoken by a few families in Gilgit city.

Media

Television channels

Radio
These are not dedicated Khowar channels but play most programmes in Khowar.

Newspapers

Further reading

References

Additional references
 Bashir, Elena (2001) "Spatial Representation in Khowar". Proceedings of the 36th Annual Meeting of the Chicago Linguistic Society. Chicago: Chicago Linguistic Society.
 
 L'Homme, Erik (1999) Parlons Khowar. Langue et culture de l'ancien royaume de Chitral au Pakistan. Paris: L'Harmatta

 Morgenstierne, Georg (1936) "Iranian Elements in Khowar". Bulletin of the School of Oriental and African Studies,  Vol. VIII, London.
 Badshah Munir Bukhari (2001) Khowar language. University publisher. Pakistan
 Morgenstierne, Georg (1947) "Some Features of Khowar Morphology". Norsk Tidsskrift for Sprogvidenskap, Vol. XIV, Oslo.
 Morgenstierne, Georg (1957) Sanskritic Words in Khowar. Felicitation Volume Presented to S. K. Belvalkar. Benares. 84–98 [Reprinted in Morgenstierne (1973): Irano-Dardica, 267–72]
 Mohammad Ismail Sloan (1981) Khowar-English Dictionary. Peshawar. .
 Decker, Kendall D. (1992). Languages of Chitral (Sociolinguistic Survey of Northern Pakistan, 5). National Institute of Pakistani Studies, 257 pp. .
Zeal News
″https://www.chitraltoday.net/2015/06/cultural-diversity-of-chitral/#:~:text=Chitral%20is%20also%20the%20most,lived%20together%20peacefully%20for%20centuries.

External links

 
 
 

Khowar language
Dardic languages
Languages of Chitral
Languages of Khyber Pakhtunkhwa
Languages of Pakistan
Languages of Gilgit-Baltistan